Petrana Koleva (born 11 October 1947) is a Bulgarian sprint canoer who competed in the early 1970s. She finished eighth in the K-2 500 m event at the 1972 Summer Olympics in Munich.

References
Sports-reference.com profile

1947 births
Bulgarian female canoeists
Canoeists at the 1972 Summer Olympics
Living people
Olympic canoeists of Bulgaria
Place of birth missing (living people)